Hal Campbell Hudson (May 4, 1927 – July 8, 2016) was an American professional baseball player. A left-handed pitcher, he worked in six Major League games, all in relief, for  the St. Louis Browns (1952) and Chicago White Sox (1952–53).

Hudson's pro career extended for 13 seasons (1944–55; 1957). He earned his big-league trial with the Browns after compiling a 16–5 win-loss record and a 3.08 earned run average for the Triple-A Toronto Maple Leafs in 1951. He was treated roughly in his American League debut on April 20, 1952, allowing two hits, two bases on balls and four earned runs in two-thirds of an inning against the White Sox.  The game was suspended in the seventh frame on April 20, and completed on May 26 with Chicago winning, 10–5. Hudson would be acquired on waivers by the ChiSox on August 27, 1952, after he had spent much of the summer with Triple-A Toronto, where he won another 11 games.

Altogether, he allowed 16 hits and seven bases on balls in 10 innings pitched over his six MLB games played, with four strikeouts.

References

External links

1927 births
2016 deaths
Baseball players from Michigan
Birmingham Barons players
Buffalo Bisons (minor league) players
Charleston Senators players
Chicago White Sox players
Dothan Browns players
Elmira Pioneers players
Gloversville-Johnstown Glovers players
Major League Baseball pitchers
Muskogee Reds players
Newark Moundsmen players
St. Louis Browns players
San Antonio Missions players
Toronto Maple Leafs (International League) players
Wichita Indians players
People from Grosse Pointe, Michigan